Hanlim Multi Art School is an arts high school located in Songpa District in Seoul, South Korea.

History
Hanlim School was founded on 3 March 1962, with Lee Hyeon-man being appointed school principal. In 2009, it became the Hanlim Multi Arts High School. It is known as one of the schools attended by current and future members of the South Korean entertainment industry, alongside the School of Performing Arts Seoul and Lila Art High School. Due to the fame of some of their students, the school is sometimes the subject of press, especially during graduation ceremonies.

Departments
 Broadcasting & Entertainment Department
 Musical Theatre Department
 Practical Dance Department
 Applied Music Department
 Fashion Model Department
 Film Making Department

Notable alumni

 
 
 

 Baek Ye-rin
 Cha Eun-woo
 Cho Seung-youn (aka "Woodz")
 Cho Yi-hyun
 Choi Bo-min
 Choi Hyun-wook
 Choi Ye-na
 Choi Yu-jin
 Chou Tzu-yu
 Go Yoon-hwan (aka "Ryeoun")
 Go Won-hee
 Han Sang-hyuk (aka "Hyuk")
 Hur Hyun-jun
 Huh Yun-jin
 Im So-eun (aka "NC.A")
 Jeon So-mi
 Jihoon of Treasure
 Jung Il-hoon
 Kang Hye-won
 Kang Hyung-gu (aka "Kino")
 Kang Joo-hee (aka "Rothy")
 Kim Chae-won
 Kim Da-hyun
 Kim Jin-kyung
 Kim Ji-woo (aka "Chuu")
 Kim Samuel
 Kim Ye-rim (aka "Yeri")
 Kim Yu-gyeom
 Kwon Eun-bin
 Krystal Jung
 Lee Hae-in
 Lee Ho-jung
 Lee Ji-hoon
 Lee Ji-hoon (aka "Woozi")
 Lee Joo-won (aka "JooE")
 Lee Su-ji
 Lee Tae-hwan
 Lee Tae-min
 Moon Bin
 Moon Jong-up
 Nam Hyun-joon
 Nam Tae-hyun
 Nam Yoon-su
 Nancy Jewel McDonie
 Ong Seong-wu
 Park Ji-min (aka "Jamie")
 Park Jin-woo (aka “JinJin”)
 Park Su-bin (aka "Dalsooobin")
 Park Yoo-na
 Park Min-hyuk (aka "Rocky")
 Pyo Ji-hoon (aka "P.O.")
 Shin Dong-ho
 Shin Dong-woo
 Shin Jae-ha
 Son Chae-young
 Song Min-ho (aka "Mino")
 Song Yu-bin
 Wang Yibo
 Yang Hye-sun (aka "Yeonjae")
 Yoo Seon-ho
 Yoo Yeon-jung
 Yook Sung-jae
 Yoon Chae-kyung
 Yoon San-ha

References

External links
 

High schools in Seoul
Art schools in South Korea
Educational institutions established in 1960